Collet v. Collet, 2 U.S. (2 Dall.) 294 (C.C.D. Pa. 1792), was a Supreme Court of the United States decision that was the earliest appellate case docketed although it was never heard by the Court. Van Staphorst v. Maryland was the first case docketed with the court. West v. Barnes was the first case decided by the court.

Collet originated as an assumpsit case in Pennsylvania state court, but eventually came to the federal Circuit Court in Philadelphia where the Circuit Court ruled that Congress' power of naturalization was concurrent with the state's. Collet obtained a writ of error but dropped the case before reaching the Supreme Court.

See also
 List of United States Supreme Court cases, volume 2
 List of United States Supreme Court cases prior to the Marshall Court

References

1791 in United States case law
United States Supreme Court cases
United States Supreme Court cases of the Jay Court